Nathaniel Joseph Spears (born May 3, 1985) is an American former professional baseball utility player and current minor league coach. He played in Major League Baseball (MLB) for the Boston Red Sox.

Playing career
Spears was drafted by the Baltimore Orioles in the 5th round of the 2003 Major League Baseball draft out of Charlotte High School in Punta Gorda, Florida.

Baltimore Orioles
Spears made his professional debut with the Rookie-level Gulf Coast League Orioles, hitting .289 in 56 games. He played 2004 with Single-A Delmarva, hitting .275 in 97 games. His best year in the Oriole organization was in 2005 with High-A Frederick, where he hit .294 in 112 games and was both a Mid-Season and Post-Season Carolina League All-Star.

Chicago Cubs
On January 9, 2006, Spears was traded to the Chicago Cubs in the Corey Patterson deal. His debut in the Cubs' organization wasn't the greatest, hitting only .246 in 97 games with High-A Daytona. He started 2007 with Daytona, but was promoted to Double-A Tennessee, where he hit .298 in 38 games there. He played 2008 with Tennessee, where he was a Southern League All-Star and was the Best Hustler. He also played five games with Triple-A Iowa. He also played in the Arizona Fall League for Mesa, hitting .349 in 23 games. He played 2009 with Iowa, where he only hit .253 in 128 games.

Boston Red Sox
On March 3, 2010, Spears was signed to a minor league deal with an invite to spring training by the Boston Red Sox, where he went 4-6 in 6 games. He played that year with Double-A Portland, where he was an Eastern League All-Star, hitting .272 in 136 games. He was again invited to spring training, hitting .290 in 28 games. He started 2011 with Triple-A Pawtucket before his promotion.

He was called up to the Red Sox on September 5, 2011. Drew Sutton was designated for assignment to make room for him on the 40-man roster.

Spears started the 2012 season in Pawtucket. He was called up from Pawtucket to play with the MLB Boston on April 15, 2012. On April 22, Spears was designated for assignment. After clearing waivers, Spears was outrighted to the Pawtucket Red Sox. In October 2012, Spears elected minor league free agency.

Cleveland Indians 
On November 16, 2012, the Indians signed Spears to a minor league deal. He played 68 games for the Columbus Clippers and 4 games for the Akron Aeros in 2013. He became a free agent at the end of the season.

Philadelphia Phillies
Spears signed a minor league deal with the Philadelphia Phillies on June 8, 2014. He hit .299 with 2 HR and 15 RBI in 52 games with Triple-A Lehigh Valley. He elected free agency after the 2014 season.

Somerset Patriots
Spears signed with the Somerset Patriots of the Atlantic League of Professional Baseball for the 2015 season. He became a free agent after the 2015 season.

Coaching career 
Spears was a coaching assistant in 2016 with Boston's Single-A affiliate, the Greenville Drive. He was named hitting coach for the Lowell Spinners, Boston's Class A-Short Season affiliate, in January 2017. In February 2021, he was named hitting coach for Greenville, now a Boston farm team at the Class A-Advanced level.

References

External links

1985 births
Living people
Major League Baseball infielders
Boston Red Sox players
Gulf Coast Orioles players
Delmarva Shorebirds players
Frederick Keys players
Daytona Cubs players
Tennessee Smokies players
Iowa Cubs players
Portland Sea Dogs players
Pawtucket Red Sox players
Akron Aeros players
Columbus Clippers players
Somerset Patriots players
Lehigh Valley IronPigs players
Sportspeople from Fort Myers, Florida
Baseball players from Florida
Mesa Solar Sox players
Gigantes del Cibao players
American expatriate baseball players in the Dominican Republic
Charlotte High School (Punta Gorda, Florida) alumni